Procypris mera (common name: Chinese ink carp) is a species of cyprinid in the genus Procypris. It inhabits China and Vietnam and is used for food locally and nationally.

References

Cyprinid fish of Asia
Fish of Vietnam
Freshwater fish of China